Chen Chin-long (born 1 April 1953) is a Taiwanese sprinter. He competed in the men's 4 × 100 metres relay at the 1972 Summer Olympics.

References

1953 births
Living people
Athletes (track and field) at the 1972 Summer Olympics
Taiwanese male sprinters
Taiwanese male long jumpers
Olympic athletes of Taiwan
Place of birth missing (living people)